Thysanotus juncifolius, known as the fringe-lily, is a perennial herb endemic to Australia. The species name juncifolius refers to the “rush leaves”.

Unlike the similar Thysanotus tuberosus it lacks basal leaves. Small leaves may be seen along the lower stems. The habitat is eucalyptus woodland or forest, as well as moist heath areas, often in thick undergrowth. It grows to around half a metre high.

Flowers form in spring and summer. The three petaled flowers are mauve on a much branched inflorescence, with frilly edges. Flowers last only one day. They are among the more colorful wildflowers in south eastern Australia. The fruiting capsule is around 4 mm in diameter.

References 

Asparagales of Australia
Flora of New South Wales
Flora of Victoria (Australia)
Flora of South Australia
Lomandroideae